Geluksburg is a small village in the Northern of Drakensberg in the KwaZulu Natal province in South Africa, located approximately 24 km from Bergville, close to Green Point and to the Free State border between the Oliviershoek and Van Reenen mountain passes. The village lies 6 km below the base of the Thintwa mountains of Thintwa Village. 

These ridges provide spectacular views of the Northern Drakensberg. Furthermore, these foothills contain striking examples of San Rock Art. These are not yet open to the public due to archaeological survey work. The word “Geluk” means ‘luck’ in Afrikaans and ‘Burg’ a town or residential area. This village is a place of peace and seclusion. 

The closest other towns are:
Bergville
Ladysmith
Harrismith

History
Geluksburg played an essential role in the history of the Bushmen (San), Zulu, Boer and British. Firstly inhabited by the Bushman. However, they were forced out of the region by  Nguni clans and the early European settlers. King Shaka’s Mfecane during the early 1800s added to their displacement from this area.

The ‘Lost Valley’  located near Geluksburg was an early settlement of ‘Trek Boers’. This group were a “White Tribe” that lived an elementary life. Some five families lost their way from Piet Retief’s primary group, and as a result sought refuge in this valley. They were very reclusive until being discovered by a journalist in the 1950’s. The journalist observed them living in very simple mud dwellings.

The “Lost Valley” is now private farmland. However, tours can be arranged to see the remnants of the homes of this fascinating community.

Schools
 Maswazi Primary,
 Rheibokspruit Primary,
 Thintwa Secondary,
 Ekukhuleni Early Childhood Development,
 Jabulani Primary

Notable residents
 Alison Oates, DA Leader in Harrismith.
 Sinenjabulo Shabalala, a teacher.
 Emsie van Wyk, UKZN Lecturer.
 Dingaan Ntuli, taxi owner.
 Njabulo Wonderboy Nkabinde, tutor and pastor.
 Chris Jacobz, a farmer.
 Kobie van de Merwe, former Ward Councillor.
 Robin van Rooijan, businessman.
 Tracey Botha, model.
 Natalie Buitendag, former leader of the IFP in Ladysmith.
 John Graham
 Micheal, the founder and owner of Sportec.

References

Populated places in the Okhahlamba Local Municipality